Old Peter Mokaba Stadium (previously Pietersburg Stadium) is a multi-purpose stadium in Polokwane (formerly Pietersburg), South Africa. It was the home stadium of Ria Stars football club before they were disbanded. The stadium has a capacity of 15,000 people and was built in 1976. The Peter Mokaba Stadium was constructed to the east of this stadium for the 2010 World Cup.

In January 2022, the stadium hosted the 110th anniversary celebration of the African National Congress.

References

Soccer venues in South Africa
Sports venues in Limpopo
Polokwane
Multi-purpose stadiums in South Africa